9 Standards (Quartet) 1993 is a double CD live album by American saxophonist and composer Anthony Braxton recorded  at Wesleyan University in 1993 and released on the English Leo label.

Reception

The AllMusic review by Chris Kelsey awarded the album 4½ stars stating "Braxton plays this entire live set as if he's got something to prove, and the result is very possibly the most inspired mainstream playing he's ever put on record".

Track listing

Recorded at Wesleyan University in Middletown, Connecticut on February 25, 1993

Personnel
Anthony Braxton – alto saxophone, sopranino saxophone, flute 
Fred Simmons - piano
Paul Brown - bass 
Leroy Williams - drums

References

Leo Records live albums
Anthony Braxton live albums
1993 live albums